Pujol is a Mexican restaurant named by Wall Street Journal as the best in Mexico City.

The restaurant is run by chef Enrique Olvera, who trained at the Culinary Institute of America and who oversees the onboard menu in business class of airline Aeromexico.
Pujol serves Mexican cuisine as refined and elegant plates built from indigenous ingredients that pay tribute to Mexico’s rich culinary history.

Awards

World's 50 Best Restaurants 
Pujol was named the 17th best restaurant in the world by Restaurant magazine in 2013.

In 2014, Pujol was ranked 20th among the World’s 50 Best Restaurants.

In 2015, Pujol was ranked 16th among the World’s 50 Best Restaurants.

In 2016, Pujol was ranked 25th among the World’s 50 Best Restaurants, and was listed as the 5th best restaurant in Latin America.

In 2017, Pujol was ranked 20th among the World’s 50 Best Restaurants.

In 2018, Pujol was ranked 13th among the World’s 50 Best Restaurants.

In 2019, Pujol was ranked 12th among the World’s 50 Best Restaurants. Two Peruvian restaurants, Maido and Central, occupied the first two positions on the list, respectively.

See also
 List of Mexican restaurants
 Local food

References

External links
Official website

Mexican restaurants in Mexico
Restaurants in Mexico City
Molecular gastronomy